Marian Teodor Ludwik Gieszczykiewicz (born 21 May 1889 in Kraków, Austria-Hungary - 21 July 1942 in Auschwitz.) was a Polish physician, bacteriologist.

Gieszczykiewicz was professor at the Jagiellonian University starting in 1924 and member of the Polish Academy of Skills. During the German occupation he taught at the so-called "Secret Universities".

He was imprisoned in the German concentration camp Auschwitz. Gerhard Palitzsch assassinated him on 31 July 1942.

References 

1889 births
1942 deaths
Academic staff of Jagiellonian University
Polish microbiologists
Polish resistance members of World War II
Polish civilians killed in World War II
Polish people who died in Auschwitz concentration camp
Scientists from Kraków